The 1979 Indian vice presidential election was held in mid-1979 to elect Vice-President of India. Former Chief Justice Mohammad Hidayatullah was elected unopposed for the post. Had the election been contested by more than one candidate, it would have occurred on 27 August 1979.

Schedule
The election schedule was announced by the Election Commission of India on 23 July 1979.

Result
Mohammad Hidayatullah was declared as elected unopposed to the office of the Vice-President on 9 August 1979. He was sworn in to the office on 31 August 1979.

See also
 1977 Indian presidential election

References

Vice-presidential elections in India
India